De la Cour is a French-language surname, meaning "of the court". The alternative forms Delacour and Delacourt were used by a Huguenot refugee who settled in Portarlington, County Laois, as well as his descendants who later moved to County Cork and then to England.

De la Cour
Didier de La Cour (1550–1623), French Benedictine monk
Claude-Michel Bégon de la Cour (1683–1748), French colonial military officer
Charles-Joseph Mathon de la Cour (1738–1793), French art critic
Ethel De la Cour (1869–1957), British educator
Joseph De La Cour (1894–1967), American politician
Michaela Dornonville de la Cour (born 1961), Swedish pop singer
Henric de la Cour (born 1974), Swedish songwriter
Adam de la Cour (born 1979), British composer
Anne Cecilie de la Cour (born 1993), Danish handball player

Delacour
William Delacour (1700–1767), French painter 
Alfred Delacour (1817–1883), French playwright and librettist
Reginald B. DeLacour (1886–1948), American general
Jean Théodore Delacour (1890–1985), French-born American ornithologist 
Marcelle Delacour, French table tennis player
Yves Delacour (1930-2014), French rower
Josephine White deLacour (1849–1929), American doctor
Perrine Delacour (born 1994), French golfer

Fictional characters:
Fleur Delacour, from the Harry Potter series
Gabrielle Delacour, younger sister of Fleur Delacour

De la Court and Delacourt
Pieter de la Court (1618–1685), Dutch economist
Petronella de la Court (1624–1707), Dutch art collector
Charles Delacourt-Smith, Baron Delacourt-Smith (1917–1972), British trade unionist and Labour Party politician
Grégoire Delacourt (born 1960), French advertiser and writer
Marianne Delacourt, pen name of Marianne de Pierres (born 1961), Australian science fiction writer
Susan Delacourt, Canadian political journalist
Benjamin Delacourt (born 1985), French footballer

See also
La Cour, a similar surname

References

French-language surnames